The Škoda Fabia is a supermini car produced by Czech manufacturer Škoda Auto since 1999. It is the successor of the Škoda Felicia, which was discontinued in 2001. The Fabia was available in hatchback, estate (named Fabia Combi) and saloon (named Fabia Sedan) body styles at launch, and since 2007, the second generation is offered in hatchback and estate versions. The third generation Fabia was launched in 2015, and the fourth in 2021.

First generation (Type 6Y; 1999)

The first generation Fabia (given the internal type code 6Y) was officially presented at the Frankfurt Motor Show in September 1999 and production of this model started in October the same year. The estate version Fabia Combi was introduced in September 2000 at the Paris Motor Show. It was the first model to use the Volkswagen Group's A04 platform, which it shared with the Volkswagen Polo Mk4 and SEAT Ibiza. In the United Kingdom, for 2000, this car won What Car?s "Car of the Year".
The range started with the 1.0 8v Classic (which was cheaper than Volkswagen's smaller 3-door 1.0 Lupo when it went on sale) to the 1.9 PD TDi RS.

Part of the Fabia's success was the fact that all of its mechanical parts were developed by or in conjunction with Volkswagen, but were offered in a package that is priced to undercut other models in the Volkswagen Group. The only traces of non-VW Škoda left in the Fabia are the 1.0 and 1.4 8v "MPI" engines, which were  modifications to Škoda's own 1.3 engine, and were used in pre-Volkswagen Škodas such as the Estelle and Favorit.

In 2004 the Fabia received a facelift, with changed front fog lights and grille, slightly different rear lights, new steering wheel and revised specification levels. The RS also had its final gearbox ratio changed. Most importantly, the Sport model was added, with the  1.4 petrol being offered with a manual transmission. This engine was quickly dropped for the 1.2 HTP, which while not as powerful, was a much more free revving engine giving a more sporty feel and flexible drive. The Sport also had its specification changed to include red seat belts and sunset privacy glass from the B pillar to the rear.

Again in 2006, the Fabia range was shown at the Geneva Motor Show had minor specification revisions. These include a center rear headrest, a central three-point seatbelt and an additional four bodywork colours. The 1.4 16v  petrol engine was replaced with a more powerful 1.4 16v  engine.

Engines

The term MPI (Multi-Point Injection) is used by Škoda to differentiate from 16v models and (in the case of the Octavia Mk2) FSI engines. The  version of the 1.4 16v was only mated to Volkswagen's four-speed automatic transmission with fuzzy logic operation until the addition of earlier Sport models which mated it with a manual transmission. The 1.4 8v was dropped in 2003. The Fabia's overall performance and fuel consumption figures fall behind other city cars and small family cars as it is larger and heavier. However, the 1.2 HTP (High Torque Performance) engine was developed specifically for the Fabia and offers better performance and fuel economy, and was later used in Volkswagen's own Polo due to its high acclaim. It was also the highest displacement 3 cylinder petrol engine until 2014 and BMW's 1.5-litre 3 cylinder turbo engine.

Trim levels
At launch, the Fabia was available in three trim levels: Classic, Comfort, and Elegance. Later in the Fabia's life the mid-range Comfort model was dropped for the name Ambiente to fit in with the rest of the range. Other models available throughout the car's lifespan included Ambiente SE, Blackline, Silverline, Sport, Bohemia (estate only, run-out model) and RS. Various safety features and minor changes were made over time. Easy and Junior models were sold in Eastern European markets where the buying power is lower. Some of these Fabias do not have painted bumpers, side mirrors or gloveboxes. The Junior didn't have power steering and the steering wheel was 'borrowed' from Octavia I. Because of that, it was slightly bigger, with a diameter of 380 mm instead of the regular 370 mm found on all the other Fabia models. Also sold in such markets is the Fabia Praktik, which is a panel van version of the Fabia with the rear windows and seats removed. A lesser powered version of the 1.4 MPI with just  is also sold in Eastern Europe.
The downfall of this weaker engine was that it struggled to shift the weighty car. Unless on flat surfaces it struggled to achieve higher than 30MPG.

Fabia RS
Introduced in 2003, the Fabia RS (vRS in the UK), while not the first diesel hot hatch, was the first exclusively diesel hot hatch, having no petrol equivalent. It was named the "Diesel Car of the Year 2003" in the Scottish Car of the Year Awards. It also falls in a low tax band (Band C) in the UK, further increasing its cost benefits over its (chiefly petrol-powered) counterparts.

Official figures state 0 to 100 km/h (62 mph) takes 9.6 seconds, but several motoring magazines and websites have measured faster times (around the 7.0–7.5 seconds range) (Autocar: 7.1 seconds, Auto Express: 8.1 seconds, and FastHatchbacks.com: 8.5 seconds). The in gear acceleration times are 50–70 mph in 5.6 seconds, quicker than BMW's 330i which takes 6.0 seconds. 20–40 mph in 2.4 seconds is as quick as the Lotus Elise 111R.

The RS was shown to be quicker than a similarly priced MINI Cooper around Top Gear's and Fifth Gear's test tracks.

In 2007 1,000 Special Edition Fabia RS models were produced featuring individually numbered black leather seats with blue piping, sporty red brake callipers, "Race Blue" metallic paint, cruise control, darkened rear windows and a six CD autochanger.  This model was known as the Fabia vRS SE.

The last Mk1 Fabia RS came off the production line in March 2007 – being UK 2007/07 registered. There is also a 2009 version, which is believed to be a late registration.

According to Škoda UK, there were only 22 of these 2007 registered marks (not including the 1000 Special Edition RS SEs).

Second generation (Type 5J; 2007)

The second generation Fabia (internal type code 5J) was officially presented at the Geneva Auto Show in March 2007 and was sold from April 2007. It still uses the PQ24 platform. The car is however slightly larger than its predecessor and takes styling cues from the Roomster, Škoda's small MPV. The exterior of the two cars, Roomster and Fabia, were designed simultaneously to create synergies by Thomas Ingenlath and Peter Wouda.

The estate variant was officially announced in August 2007 and was introduced at the Frankfurt Motor Show in September 2007. Compared with the first generation the new Combi is  longer,  higher and the boot has grown by 54 litres (to 480 litres total). The engine portfolio is the same as the hatchback version, without the 1.2 44 kW one.

The initial petrol engine line-up was a mixture of newer engines from Audi and some carry-overs from the outgoing model. In comparison to the 1st-generation Fabia, both basic 1.2-litre 3-cylinders gained 4 kW each: new power peak was 44 kW (60 PS), and 51 kW (70 PS). There was only a single 1.4-litre 16v petrol on this model, producing 63 kW (86 PS). The range-topping petrol engine was the 1.6-litre 4-cylinder with variable valve timing producing 77 kW (105 hp). There was also an option to mate this engine with a 6-speed tiptronic transmission sourced from Aisin.

The diesel range featured the same 51 kW (70 PS) and 59 kW (80 PS) 1.4-litre Pumpe-Düse 3-cylinders from the predecessor model. The top-of-the-range diesel was a 1.9-litre Pumpe-Düse 4-cylinder producing 77 kW (105 PS).

The second generation Fabia trim levels were Classic, Ambiente, Sport and Elegance. In the UK the trim levels were called 1, 2, Sport, 3, and GreenLine (later S, SE, Elegance, and GreenLine). In India, the trim levels were Active, Classic, Ambiente and Elegance. All models sold within the EU were equipped with ABS, front passenger, driver and side airbags. Curtain airbags and ESC were available as an option.

Though the sedan body, and the VRS version were discontinued (the latter until facelift in 2010), the 2nd-generation Fabia offered variety of new choices. At the Frankfurt International Motor Show (IAA) 2007 Škoda presented near-production-state design study of the Fabia Scout: a rugged version of the Fabia Combi. However, it was until May 2009 when this car finally started to roll off the production line in Mladá Boleslav. The new-generation Fabia featured a specific design element: a roof in different colour than the rest of the body was available as an option.

Facelift

The facelifted Fabia and Fabia Combi (estate/wagon) were premiered at the 2010 Geneva Motor Show. The updated version can be easily distinguished from prior versions by the different shape of the front bumper and front fog lights. The facelift to the second-generation Fabia also brought Xenon headlights as standard on higher end models. Inside, new steering wheels were a noticeable difference. Though their shape remained the same, headlights with a projector module underwent technical changes: for full beam, a separate reflector is fitted on the inner side of the lamp, while the projector module (providing a dimmed beam) is on the outer side.

The engine line-up was updated along with a facelift, too. 1.2-litre TSI turbocharged petrol engines came as a replacement of the previous 1.4 and 1.6-litre MPI engines, providing significant improvements to fuel consumption and corresponding reductions in  emissions. The Aisin automatic transmission previously used was also replaced with the 7-speed DSG dual-clutch gearbox (optional on 77 kW (105 PS; 103 hp) 1.2 TSI models), providing a reduction of over 30% in  emissions for the 77 kW (105 PS; 103 hp) automatic derivative (compared to the previous 1.6-litre). Diesel engines were updated to the common rail system and four-valve technology.

With the facelift a sports VRS version returned to the range, now available as both hatchback and estate. This model features the same 1.4-litre twin-charged petrol engine as the Volkswagen Polo Mk5 GTI, producing 132 kW (180 PS) and is mated with a 7-speed DSG dual-clutch transmission as standard. With top speed 226 km/h (Fabia Combi VRS), this is the fastest production Fabia ever. The VRS had its own version of the cake advertisement – ‚Mean Green‘, with a darker rock version of "My Favorite Things".

The GreenLine model received new technology, as well. Gerhard Plattner, Austrian economy driver, managed to reach 2,006 km on a single tank of fuel, that is 2.21 L/100 km (127.8 mpg imp / 106.4 mpg US).

New to the lot was Monte Carlo version for both Fabia and Fabia Combi, using design features from the Škoda Fabia Sports Design Concept presented at 2009 Geneva Motor Show.

At the 30th Wörthersee GTI Treffen, Škoda revealed Fabia VRS 2000 design study based on Super 2000 rally car.

4 May 2012 Škoda produced 3-millionth Fabia.

In total, 1,790,900 1st-generation Fabia and 1,704,100 2nd-generation Fabias have been produced.

Marketing

United Kingdom

For the launch of the new Fabia, Škoda UK commissioned an advertising campaign called Cake, featuring the making of a Fabia car out of cake which swapped rivets for raisins, metal for marzipan and spark plugs for sugar.

China
Shanghai Volkswagen Automotive introduced the new Fabia to the public at the 2008 Guangzhou Motor Show. It was launched in China for the 2009 model year.

India
Škoda India launched the latest version of Fabia in 2008. The car was well praised by Indian motor magazines, but it couldn't live up to the hype created by the previous generation Octavia. Fabia has not succeeded in this market due to dealer problems, steep prices and Škoda trying to position itself as a luxury marque. Škoda India has decided to bring in more powerful engines at better prices and taken strict measures to improve dealer quality levels and curb excessive service costs.

Safety

Engines
The initial petrol engine lineup was a mixture of newer engines from Audi and some carry overs from the outgoing model. There was only a single 1.4-litre 16v petrol on this model, producing . The range topping petrol engine was the 1.6 16v engine producing  . There was also an option to link this engine to a six speed tiptronic transmission sourced from Aisin.

Diesel engines consisted of the same  and  1.4 TDI units from before. The range topping diesel was a 1.9 TDI producing .

The top-of-the-line RS model (vRS in the UK) features the same 1.4-litre engine as the Volkswagen Polo Mk5 GTI, producing  and is fitted with a seven-speed DSG semi automatic transmission as standard. The vRS had its own version of the cake advertisement, with a darker rock version of "My Favorite Things".

Overview of engines available for the 2nd-generation Fabia (A05, Type 5J), incl. facelifted model.

Petrol engines

Diesel engines

Related models
The Škoda Roomster is a multi-purpose vehicle, also available as a panel van, that is based on the same platform and that also features the same front end design.

In 2011, the Škoda Rapid was launched in India, a four-door sedan car featuring the same front end design as the second generation Fabia, but based instead on the newer PQ25 platform. It is related with the 2010 Volkswagen Vento, also developed in India, which is essentially a three-box version of the Volkswagen Polo Mk5. It is produced by Škoda India exclusively for the Indian market. It also has a slightly different interior.

Motorsport

The Motorsport division of Škoda AUTO builds Škoda Fabia Super 2000 rally car. Since its debut in 2009, the Fabia Super 2000 won 14 international titles and 22 national championships. Lars Larsson won the FIA European Rallycross Championship in 2007. Sergey Zagumennov did the same in 2014

Third generation (Type NJ; 2014)

The third generation Fabia was introduced at the Paris Motor Show in October 2014, with sales starting in the following month. Production was launched prior to the end of August 2014 in Mladá Boleslav, with manufacturing of the estate version first occurring in December 2014. Due to the low sales of RS models from the previous model generation, a hot hatch variant is not planned for production.

The Mk3 Fabia - like the facelifted Mk5 Volkswagen Polo starting 2014 - underwent a major technical revision, being based on the PQ26 platform: a mixture of the PQ25 platform (Volkswagen Polo MK5 pre-facelift, 2009–2014) and the MQB platform, which is currently used by seven Volkswagen Group models. The chassis has been modified to "revert to the Fabia’s original, first-generation design" by becoming 90 mm wider and 30 mm lower, resulting in more interior and boot space. Despite being 8 mm shorter, the Mk3 Fabia still offers more passenger room due to its extended wheelbase. A similar approach was applied to the styling, according to Škoda designer Marko Jevtic: "It [the Mk3 model] has the qualities of the first Fabia, [...] We wanted its simplicity; we did not want to overload the design."

The Mk3 Fabia won the "Overall winner" and "Best small car" categories of the 2015 What Car? Car of the Year awards.

Safety
The 3rd generation Fabia now comes equipped with the Front assist safety system. It gathers data from a radar sensor to automatically warn the driver and apply the brakes at the possibility of a collision at certain speeds.

Engines
The powertrain selection for the Mk3 Fabia was borrowed from the current Mk5 Polo, although the missing 1.2-litre TDI engine was slated to be included in the fuel economy-oriented Greenline model that was due for release in late 2015. Instead, the Greenline name was dropped, in favour of using the TDI nameplate, and a newer inline-three 1.4-litre engine was put to use in the Diesel model instead, with two different levels of power output available. The 1.2-litre inline-three petrol engines from the Mk2 model were replaced by smaller but more efficient 1.0-litre engines, introduced from June 2017.

 Facelift 
The Mk3 Fabia and Fabia Combi were facelifted for the 2019 model year. The trim levels for the Fabia have been reorganised, with the S model continuing as the entry level trim level, with the Monte Carlo now being the range topping model, with the SE, the Colour Edition, and the SE L bridging the gap in between respectively. Revisions included a redesigned front-end, with a new wider grille and redesigned headlights, with the option of Full LED headlights now available. The rear of the car was also given a slight update with new bumper-mounted reflectors, and the option for Full LED rear lights, which are now included as standard on the range-topping Monte Carlo trim level. On the Interior of the car, the trim inserts and central transmission tunnel housing can now be customised with coloured trim. Also included on the interior of the vehicle, the Swing radio system on lower trim levels now includes a larger 6.5 inch display offered on the S model, with the SE model having the Swing Plus system included, with the 7 inch Amundsen system being offered on the SE and above.

In terms of engines, the Diesel engines have been removed from the line-up, which means the model range consists of petrol engines only. The 1.0 MPI is offered on the lower spec S and SE models, with the more powerful 1.0 TSI being offered on the SE model and above.

As of 2020, Skoda manufactured 1 million 3rd-gen Fabia.

Motorsport

The Škoda Fabia R5 is a Group R rally version of the car and it has been competing in the European Rally Championship since the 2015 edition, as well as in the World Rally Championship-2, also since the 2015 edition.

Concept cars
The Funstar (stylised as FUNStar') is a pick-up concept car based on the Mk3 Fabia. It was designed by Škoda Auto University students as a throwback to the Felicia Fun, a compact pick-up car produced during the 1990s. It was shown at the annual 2015 Wörthersee GTI fan meeting.

The exterior received a unique paint make-up, complemented with green day-running lights, 18-inch wheels from the Octavia RS and bonnet vents. The pick-up bed required the removal of the C-pillars, necessitating wider B-pillars and stiffened side panels to retain structural strength. The Funstar is powered by a 1.2-litre TSI petrol engine, paired with a 7-speed dual-clutch transmission. A 1.8-litre engine was originally planned for use but could not be implemented due to its size.

Fourth generation (2021) 

The fourth generation Škoda Fabia went on sale towards the end of 2021. The new Fabia sports an updated design more consistent of other models in the Škoda range. The fourth generation will also be based upon the MQB-A0 platform, Volkswagen Group's shared vehicle platform currently used to produce other Škoda vehicles; the Scala and the Kamiq. Due to this change, the dimensions of the new hatchback have again changed when compared to its predecessor.

The car has received aerodynamic adjustments which have achieved a reduction in drag coefficient from 0.32 to 0.28, which Škoda claim makes it "the best in the small car segment".

Detailed information about the model's engine range has been revealed. All engines will be from the Volkswagen Group's Evo engine range, with power outputs ranging from 65PS up to 150PS.

Mid-2021, Skoda cancelled its project to renew the Fabia Combi due to Euro 7 standards. By the end of 2022, Fabia entered the Egyptian market.

References

External links

 

Fabia
Subcompact cars
Euro NCAP superminis
Hatchbacks
Front-wheel-drive vehicles
Rally cars
Cars introduced in 1999
Cars of the Czech Republic
2000s cars
2010s cars
Station wagons